In German film history, an Überläufer (literally defector) is a film that was in production under the Third Reich but only completed and premiered after the end of the Second World War. The vast majority of such films are romantic comedies with no reference to the political and military situation of the time.

Completed shortly before the end of the war
 Eyes of Love (dir. Alfred Braun)
 Friday the Thirteenth (dir. Erich Engels)
 Ghost in the Castle (dir. Hans H. Zerlett)
 How Do We Tell Our Children? (dir. Hans Deppe)
 In the Temple of Venus (dir. Hans H. Zerlett)
 Insolent and in Love (dir. Hans Schweikart)
 Melusine (dir. Hans Steinhoff), released 2014
 Quax in Africa (dir. Helmut Weiss)
 Under the Bridges (dir. Helmut Käutner)

Completed after the end of the war
 The Appeal to Conscience (dir. Karl Anton)
 The Court Concert (dir. Paul Verhoeven)
 An Everyday Story (dir. Günther Rittau)
 Die Fledermaus (dir. Géza von Bolváry)
 A Heart Beats for You (dir. Joe Stöckel)
 The Man in the Saddle (dir. Harry Piel), released 2000
 Night of the Twelve (dir. Hans Schweikart)
 Peter Voss, Thief of Millions (dir. Karl Anton)
 Thank You, I'm Fine (dir. Erich Waschneck)
 Tiefland (dir. Leni Riefenstahl)
 Ulli and Marei (dir. Leopold Hainisch)
 Viennese Girls (dir. Willi Forst)

See also
Nazism and cinema
List of German films of 1933–45

Cinema of Germany
 Uberlaufer